The men's road race H4 cycling event at the 2016 Summer Paralympics took place on September 17 at Pontal, Rio. Thirteen riderscompeted. The race distance was 60 km.

Results : Men's road race H4

References

Men's road race H4